Audrey Josephine Cahn (17 October 1905 – 1 April 2008) was an Australian microbiologist and nutritionist.

The daughter of Professor William Alexander Osborne and Ethel Elizabeth Goodson, a medical practitioner and industrial hygienist, she was born Audrey Josephine Osborne in Melbourne and grew up on the campus of the University of Melbourne. She earned a Bachelor of Agricultural Science at the university in 1929 and, later, received a diploma in dietetics. She first worked as a microbiologist and food analyst for Kraft. In 1930, she married Leslie Cahn, an architect. Cahn died in Canberra at the age of 102.

Career and achievements 

Cahn was employed as chief dietician at St Vincent's Hospital, at the Victorian Mental Hygiene Department and at the Royal Perth Hospital. During World War II, she was chief dietician at the Heidelberg Military Hospital. From 1947 to 1959, she was a dietetics lecturer at the University of Melbourne ; from 1959 until 1968, when she retired, she was chief lecturer in nutrition and applied dietetics at the university. Audrey Cahn was the first woman to complete the newly established agriculture degree at the University of Melbourne in 1928. 

She was a founding member of the Dietetics Association. Cahn was among the first experts to recommend reducing fat intake and substituting polyunsaturated fatty acids for saturated fats. She helped conduct a longitudinal study of child growth in Melbourne (1954–1971) which allowed the growth patterns of Australian children to be compared with children in Britain and the United States.Due to her significant contributions to medicine, Audrey Cahn Street in the Canberra suburb of Macgregor was named in her honour.

The research output of nutritional biochemist, Cahn, was well respected, having completed many studies in the field, including those undertaken during her time at the University of Melbourne from 1947 to 1968. These studies were important in examining the physical properties and energy value of common dietary foods, so that calorie tables could be compiled. Cahn was an early proponent of the need to reduce fat intake and to substitute polyunsaturated fatty acids for saturated fats. With colleagues in the anatomy department, she participated in a 17-year longitudinal study of "Child Growth in Melbourne (1954-71)". The study was compared with similar studies in the United States and Britain and found that Australian children were overweight and inactive compared with their peers elsewhere.

Early Life : 
The daughter of Professor W A and Ethel Osborne (née Goodson) Audrey Cahn was born in 1905. Her father came to Melbourne University in 1903 to take up the Chair of Physiology, Biochemistry and Histology. Her mother, who received a BSc and MSc from Leeds University, worked for the Victorian State Government examining the conditions of women in various trades. Her work led her to develop an interest in the sociological aspects of medicine and she undertook further study towards a medical degree at the University of Melbourne. She was instrumental in setting up the first Dietetics School in Victoria, at St Vincent's Hospital.

Audrey completed her secondary education at [[Merton Hall Grammar School for Girls (now known as the Church of England Girls' Grammar School ) and matriculated in 1922. She then enrolled in an Agriculture Degree at Melbourne University from which she graduated in 1928. The next year she took a position as a Microbiologist and Food Analyst with Kraft. In 1930 Audrey married Leslie Cahn, an architect, and they bore twin daughters. The marriage did not survive.

Audrey completed a Hospital Certificate of Dietetics at the newly opened Dietetics Unit at St. Vincent's Hospital. Before leaving she rose to the post of Chief Dietician at the hospital. She then took a position at Kraft/Walker and Cheese Factory in Drouin as a microbiologist . Employment as the first Chief Dietician for the Victorian Mental Hygiene Department followed, before spending a year at the Royal Perth Hospital.

During World War II, Audrey Cahn enlisted in the Australian Army Medical Women's Service on 11 February 1943. As part of the Australian Army Medical Corps she became Chief Dietician at the Heidelberg Military Hospital. Before her discharge on 13 September 1946 Audrey had obtained the rank of Major.

After the war, Audrey obtained a position as Lecturer (1947) and then Senior Lecturer (1959) in Nutrition and Applied Dietetics. Audrey Cahn retired in 1968 after spending 21 years at the university.

References 

1905 births
2008 deaths
Dietitians
Australian women scientists
Australian centenarians
University of Melbourne alumni
Academic staff of the University of Melbourne
University of Melbourne women
20th-century women scientists
Women centenarians